Seilbahn Mürren-Allmendhubel (SMA), also Allmendhubelbahn, is a funicular in Bernese Oberland in Switzerland.

The Allmendhubelbahn was brought into service in 1912, in order to simplify trade with other communes. It was soon used by many tourists and mountain hikers, and in the winter by skiers.

In 1999 the old red cars were replaced by new panoramic cars.

Further reading

See also 
 List of funicular railways
 List of funiculars in Switzerland

External links

Funicular railways in Switzerland
Bernese Oberland
Metre gauge railways in Switzerland
Transport in the canton of Bern